Below is a list of Louisiana state high school football champions sanctioned by various organizations since they began holding formal high school football state championship games in Louisiana in 1909, as well as informal state championship games held since 1907. High schools in the state are currently divided between the Louisiana High School Athletic Association, a small number of independent private schools, and those private schools that choose to compete across state lines for Midsouth Association of Independent Schools honors. In the past schools also competed under the auspices of the Louisiana Interscholastic Athletic and Literary Organization, the Louisiana Independent School Association, the Louisiana Christian School Athletic Association, and the Association of Christian Educators of Louisiana.

Background
Although numerous late-season games are known to have been hastily scheduled between prominent teams and informally dubbed "state championship" games back in high school football's early years, these games generally based their authority solely on general acclamation and were held without formal, independent third-party sponsors. Several early games are notable exceptions to this, but even then these games usually featured a home team as a draw; neutral playing sites may have given this series of games a stronger sense of legitimacy.

For what it is worth, in high school football's earliest days multiple New Orleans-area regional organizations—that were at times administered by Tulane University—came and went that could have theoretically also determined de facto state champions based sheerly on the lack of existing teams in other parts of the state. The first of these organizations, the Interscholastic Football League, was sponsored by the Tulane Athletic Association and began play for the city's pennant during the 1895 campaign.

Informal state championship games (1907–1929)
In high school football's early years, a number of prominent schools added late season games against other strong teams and claimed that these games would be for the "state championship." In some cases a third team that felt unfairly left out of the process would then challenge the winner of that state championship contest to a game of their own shortly afterward, essentially meaning that there would be a second state championship game that very same season—effectively creating a de facto early form of playoffs, just without the sponsorship of a controlling legal authority that could award a trophy. In 1914 and 1917, there were three or even four games that had been designated as state championships, as the annual State Fair of Louisiana in Shreveport and National Farm and Live Stock Show in New Orleans respectively had staged games for the title that had been considered too early in the season by some schools to truly settle the issue of crowning a champion.

The first ever champion, Jefferson College of Convent, had a campus that consisted of a high school, junior college, and college. At the time, the school regularly scheduled a mixture of high school and university-level club, junior varsity, and varsity teams. It defeated Boys High (later called Warren Easton) of New Orleans in 1907 for the first high school state title, by a score of 27–0.

Notes: *—second state championship game that season was sponsored by the Louisiana State University Athletic Department (see the "Louisiana State University Athletic Department" subsection for more information); **—first state championship game that season was sponsored by the State Fair of Louisiana (see the "State Fair of Louisiana" subsection for more information); †—first state championship game that season was sponsored by the National Farm and Live Stock Show (see the "National Farm and Live Stock Show and Live Stock Buyers' Convention" subsection for more information); ‡—second state championship game that season was sponsored by the Louisiana High School Athletic Association (see the "Louisiana High School Athletic Association" subsection for more information)

Louisiana State University Athletic Department (1909)
In 1909 the athletic department of LSU sponsored a state championship game, complete with a trophy. The hometown school, Baton Rouge High, defeated Boys High in the game, 17–5.

Calcasieu–Louisiana Fair (1910)
The first annual Calcasieu–Louisiana Fair scheduled a high school football game between the hometown Lake Charles High team and Boys High, billing it as being for the state championship. The game was a very successful draw, as 3,000 of the fair's 10,000 attendees watched LCHS' 17–11 victory.

State Fair of Louisiana (1914–1915)
The Shreveport-based State Fair of Louisiana, which was known to host football games in conjunction with the fair—the Louisiana State Fair Classic for college teams, for example—also sponsored a series of games involving high school teams in the 1910s. Although earliest teams do not appear to have been billed as facing off for the state crown, the fair began to promote later games as being for a formal state championship. However, even these games did not necessarily resolve the issue of a true state champion—and indeed may have even actually helped generate further controversy—since the annual fair always scheduled its championship game participants well before the end of the high school football season (meaning that the games may have only reflected the best teams from the first half of the season). Also, the local team from Shreveport High (later called C. E. Byrd) was usually invited to play as the representative of North Louisiana in the state fair's game, which was a particular concern in 1916 when SHS had a down year. Also, the newly-created LHSAA was largely rendering it obsolete any way.

Below is a listing of all state fair football champions.

Notes: *—championship disputed (Baton Rouge High later maintained that shortly before game time Shreveport High, later called C. E. Byrd, acknowledged fielding an ineligible player, so BRHS only agreed to continue if the game would be re-designated as an informal exhibition game; neither SHS nor the State Fair of Louisiana is known to have been documented as having corroborated this claim)

Times–Picayune (1915)
The New Orleans Times–Picayune sponsored a game (for the state championship) between two city schools, Easton and New Orleans Jesuit. The two schools had tied 6–6 earlier in the season, so the game was seen as an opportunity to both break the tie and to serve as a fundraiser for the newspaper's Doll and Toy Fund drive for needy children's Christmas presents at the same time. However, Jesuit's starting quarterback had been injured in the first game and was not able to recover in time to participate in the second game. Easton won, 13–12.

What set this state championship game apart from the state fair's game earlier that season is that this one included a private school, the first time that a private school had been allowed to compete for a state crown. Easton had actually approached Shreveport High, the state fair's champion, about playing earlier in the season but was turned down. It is not immediately clear what, if anything, of Easton's offer to play was considered objectionable to SHS.

This game was a forerunner to the annual "Toy Bowl" that the Times–Picayune began sponsoring annually in 1933 to raise money for its Doll and Toy Fund—and was occasionally held in conjunction with state championship games.

Louisiana High School Athletic Association (1916–Present)
The Louisiana High School Athletic Association (LHSAA) was founded in 1915 to serve as an interscholastic governing organization for white public high schools (since private schools were not included, a similar, competing regional organization called the "Prep School Athletic Association" was formed for New Orleans-area private schools later on that same year). Additional discussions continued on into 1916 for improving and strengthening the new body (including the drafting of a constitution). Among the earliest controversies that the fledgling LHSAA would be called upon to resolve were competing claims to the 1916 football crown. Shreveport High's regular season shutout loss to Minden High suddenly made the state fair's previously-scheduled game between SHS and Easton seem far less useful for determining the state championship. MHS and Easton quickly attempted to fit a replacement match into their existing schedules, but no firm playing date could be arranged; the LHSAA ended up siding with Easton's claim to the title. The LHSAA also faced much more serious issues in its early years, with older students enrolling in the military for the war effort and with Spanish Flu victims in general. Numerous teams were disbanded and games canceled during the outbreak, and a travel ban greatly limited the remaining active teams.

The association split into classifications based upon enrollment numbers in 1921. Private schools (1929) and schools with enrollments that were entirely African American (1968) were later extended membership relatively without incident (integrated schools, however, had never been expressly prevented from joining). The association also survived two major attempts at schisms. In 1946 the stronger public school football programs of the then-top class (Class AA) attempted to form a "Big 12" that would play a round-robin schedule to determine its champion instead of using the playoff system. After being decisively outvoted at the next LHSAA meeting, the Big 12 was not particularly forthcoming about its future plans. One of the private school representatives at the meeting likened the effort to having "bordered on fascism" for acting without private schools. In 2013 the association moved schools that had selective student body enrollments into separate divisions; the move was driven by the principal of Winnfield Senior High to minimize the impact of successful private schools John Curtis Christian of River Ridge and Evangel Christian of Shreveport (however, despite now having a much smaller pool of teams to compete against in the playoffs, Curtis and Evangel have only won two championships combined since the split). Schools deemed as "selective" included charter, dual-curriculum, laboratory, magnet, and private schools (it did not, however, include schools with gifted education programs or, notably, schools allowed to have a parish-wide attendance zone for football players if designated as the sole football-playing public school within that parish; Winnfield Senior High is the only football-playing school in Winn Parish). Though largely opposed to the split, in 2019 select schools voted to create their own "Louisiana Select Association" (LSA) to manage issues that they felt had not been properly addressed by the LHSAA membership as a whole. Shortly afterward, this new LSA—led by a number of South Louisiana schools that accused the LHSAA of not living up to its obligations to share revenue from the football championship games held at the Caesars Superdome—then declined to use the Superdome for its own select division championship games, starting with the 2019 event. However, all select championship games moved back to the Superdome in 2022. The LHSAA, which is based in Baton Rouge, has been recognized as Louisiana's sole representative to the National Federation of State High School Associations over other competing private school associations. The 2016 Louisiana floods caused extensive damage to the LHSAA's offices. Shortly before that event the LHSAA "was legally deemed a private organization"—which could hold future ramifications over the transparency of its inside activities, as well as its member schools' ability to internally and publicly challenge its decisions in a court of law.

Below is a listing of all LHSAA football champions since its founding. In recent years, six championship games (played between 2005 and 2020) were ordered forfeited by the LHSAA. In each early case, as per LHSAA rules, the runner-up was recognized as the new state champion and awarded its respective trophy, except for Baton Rouge University Lab's 2013 team, which could only be nominally acknowledged as champion since Curtis sought to challenge its forfeiture in court—and the LHSAA physically issuing the championship trophy to University Lab cannot be "revisited" until the pending lawsuit is decided. Early indications are that Baton Rouge Catholic's recently forfeited 2017 and 2020 Select Division I titles may not necessarily be reissued to the respective runners-up. It is not immediately clear why that is, given the past precedents.

Notes: *—association withheld formal sanctioning of postseason games but declared champion instead; **—association withheld formal sanctioning of postseason games but also declined to declare champions

Notes: *—association withheld formal sanctioning of postseason games but also declined to declare champion; **—association withheld formal sanctioning of postseason games but declared champions instead; †—Class A championship game ceded, by Shreveport High (later called C. E. Byrd)

Note: *—Class A championship game tie broken by total 20-yard line penetrations

Notes: *—Class AA championship game ceded, by Baton Rouge Istrouma; **—Class A championship game tie broken by total first downs; †—Class AA championship game played under "Toy Bowl" moniker; ‡—Class B championship game ceded, by New Orleans Academy; §—Class AA championship game played under "Toy Bowl" moniker

Notes: *—Class AA championship game tie broken by total first downs; **—Class AAA championship game tie broken by total first downs; †—Class AAA championship game determined by overtime; ‡—Class AAAA championship game determined by overtime

Notes: *—Class 5A championship games determined by overtime; **Class 3A championship game determined by overtime; †—Class 1A championship game determined by double-overtime; ‡—Class 4A championship game determined by forfeit, by Bastrop; §—Class 4A championship game determined by overtime

Notes: *—Non-select Class 3A championship game determined by double-overtime and Select Division II championship game determined by forfeit, by River Ridge John Curtis Christian; **—Select Division IV championship game determined by forfeit, by Baton Rouge Southern Lab; †—Select Division I championship game determined by forfeit, by Baton Rouge Catholic (the LHSAA is not yet documented as having formally recognized runner-up River Ridge John Curtis Christian as the new champion)

Note: *—Louisiana Select Association Division I championship game determined by forfeit, by Baton Rouge Catholic (the LHSAA is not yet documented as having formally recognized runner-up Shreveport Byrd as the new champion)

National Farm and Live Stock Show and Live Stock Buyers' Convention (1917)
The 1917 National Farm and Live Stock Show was held in New Orleans, complete with a relatively early-season state championship football game between Easton and Minden High that was won by Easton, 44–7.

Spalding's Official Foot Ball Guide (1918)
Despite the various wartime shortages and Spanish Flu-related travel restrictions and disbandments of teams, apparently enough games did manage to be held in 1918 that Easton would later be described as state champions by a national publication. Otherwise, the new LHSAA passed on designating its own champion, and a proposed, unsponsored championship game between Easton and Winnfield never got past the planning stages.

Texas–Louisiana Football Series (1922–1923)
In 1922 and 1923, attempts were made to pair the state champions of Louisiana and Texas in a postseason event.

In 1922, without any official explanation, the LHSAA issued a simple statement that it would not endorse any playoff games or otherwise declare a champion for that season. Speculation was that the primary playoff contenders were just simply too far spread out from each other to make it worth the effort, especially since they had fared only modestly better over the course of the season than the non-contenders had. As far as the Texas–Louisiana series was concerned, Shreveport High (which had at least managed to defeat all of its in-state opponents) was considered the champion of Louisiana for the sake of the game.

The following year, the LHSAA declined to recognize the already-scheduled state championship game between Homer and Morgan City, and declared Morgan City its champion instead. The game was played any way, with Homer winning. Homer was then designated as Louisiana's representative for the planned New Year's Day face-off between the Louisiana and Texas champions at Centenary College, under the proposed backing of the Shreveport Chamber of Commerce.

Louisiana Interscholastic Athletic and Literary Association (1936–1949)
The Louisiana Interscholastic Athletic and Literary Association (LIALA) was created for African American high schools in 1935, with the merging of two regional interscholastic organizations and the backing of Southern University. It sponsored its first football championship in 1936.

An early power in black high school football was Baton Rouge McKinley, which won every game from the start of the 1933 season going into the 1940 postseason's Magnolia Bowl against Monroe Colored High (later called Carroll)—part of that time with Eddie Robinson at quarterback. In 1939 the Capital City Free Workers attempted to host a black state championship game that included (then-independent) McKinley in a fundraiser for the local Lions Club that would also feature the LIALA champion, Bogalusa Central (later called Central Memorial)—with the winner to host a black national championship game on New Year's Day. However, McKinley ended up opting out of postseason play, leaving Central the overall state champion of record by default and ending any hopes of holding a national championship game (by the next season McKinley had joined the LIALA but was still ineligible for its state title because they had played too few conference games, hence the aforementioned appearance in the Magnolia Bowl instead of the state playoffs). They were finally able to capture the LIALA crown in 1942.

Note: *—championship game not held but league also declined to declare champion

Note: *—Class A championship determined by declaration because North Louisiana champion had no available opponents (no members of Class A were located in the southern part of the state)

Louisiana Interscholastic Athletic and Literary Organization (1950–1969)
In 1950, after the LIALA rechristened itself as the "Louisiana Interscholastic Athletic and Literary Organization" (LIALO), it openly worked with the LHSAA to restructure itself from a coordinating body into more of a governing body, with stronger rules and enforcement power. However, by 1951 the LIALO had already been accused by the principal of Winnfield Winn Training (later called Pinecrest) of "trying to purge certain members of vocal opposition to friendship politics;" he threatened to join with the other "purged" members to create a new high school athletic association. The LIALO was again accused by him in 1956 of selectively enforcing its rules with a tilt toward the southern part of the state, and thirty North Louisiana schools attempted to break away from the LIALO to form the "Louisiana Secondary School Association" as an alternative, competing organization. During the years 1965 and 1966, a tragic but also inspiring story arose out of DeQuincy as four members of their small, Class A-sized Grand Avenue team died in a car wreck just two hours after returning from winning the state championship game over Good Pine, 27–0. However, the team was able to pull together the next year and persevere as repeat-champs by an even larger margin of victory over Good Pine, this time 56–6. At the end of the 1967–68 school year, New Orleans St. Augustine left the LIALO to join the LHSAA as part of the process of desegregation efforts within the New South. Further accelerating the disbanding of the LIALO was the 1968 revelation that the association had never formally incorporated and was therefore technically not even a legally-recognized entity under Louisiana law—leading to questions over who exactly was running the organization and what they were using its membership fees for. This concern came to light when H. C. Ross of Crowley attempted to challenge the LIALO in court over one of its rulings but was then informed that there was no such organization to serve lawsuit papers to; Ross promptly withdrew from the LIALO and applied for admission to the LHSAA. By early December of 1969, a rumor spread that the LIALO would disband with its remaining members joining the LHSAA—this, despite the difficulties that St. Aug faced when transitioning over to LHSAA rules (19 football players quickly lost eligibility). Furthermore, what ended up being the last-ever LIALO state championship game was delayed a full month until mid-January 1970, as it "had been plagued with protests, courts suits, and counter-protests." Some dialogue began between the two organizations and, by the end of the 1969–70 school year, all remaining LIALO members had moved over to the LHSAA. The LHSAA is apparently in possession of few, if any, archival records from the organization, and surviving records are otherwise scarce. In addition, in 2016 the LHSAA's offices in Baton Rouge received major damage from a flood, which could have potentially destroyed any remaining records. It is not immediately clear if Southern, which helped sustain the organization, has retained any documents concerning the LIALO (Southern appears to have at least remained distant enough from the LIALO over that time period to have avoided being pulled directly into its aforementioned legal disputes). However, there is at least some LIALO-related paperwork among the Charles B. Roussève papers maintained by the Amistad Research Center at Tulane.

Notes: *—Class AA championship game tie broken by total first downs; Class B championship disputed (Winnfield Winn Training, later called Pinecrest, later claimed that it was the legitimate champion because it maintained that its scheduled championship game opponent, Lake Charles W. O. Boston, had acknowledged having too many students to participate in Class B and had not even played any conference games before being considered for South Louisiana's automatic bid to the contest—neither WOBHS nor the league is known to have been documented as having corroborated this claim, but Pinecrest is known to have refused to play the game; notably, the 1951 WOBHS annual yearbook describes its school as having won the 1950 Class A state championship instead)

Notes: *—Class AA championship game tie broken by total penetrations; **—Class AA championship game tie broken by total yardage

Note: *—Class AA championship game determined by forfeit, by Bogalusa Central Memorial

Louisiana Prep Grid Standard (1957–1959)
Lee L. Meade, Sr., a Minnesotan who would later become sports editor of The Denver Post and then help form the American Basketball Association, World Hockey Association, World TeamTennis, Major League Volleyball, and International Basketball Association sports leagues, briefly worked in Louisiana with the Lafayette Daily Advertiser and the Lake Charles American Press. While in Lake Charles he established a sports rating system that could both rank LHSAA teams and also determine possible point spreads of upcoming games, similar to what the Dunkel System and Jeff Sagarin do for various sports, most notably college football. His mathematical system, dubbed the "Louisiana Prep Grid Standard" (LPGS), was considered quite accurate by his journalistic peers. It correctly projected the results of 80% of the 1957 playoff games, including 100% of the four championship games. One of the LPGS' more notable game predictions in 1959 was that one team would beat another by a seemingly absurd point margin of 74 points; the team actually ended up winning by 75 points. In January of 1960 the Baton Rouge Morning Advocate drew up a man-made postseason ranking of the top ten LHSAA Class AAA teams from 1959 to compare with the findings of the LPGS mathematical system; the two rankings ended up very similar, as all ten teams were the same with few noteworthy disagreements in the order of those ten. At the time, the Associated Press only ranked the LHSAA's Class AAA, while Meade ranked teams in all of the classifications of the LHSAA. While the season's final AP poll was announced before the LHSAA playoffs, Meade's final rankings were issued after the playoffs—and while usually matching the actual LHSAA champions, did occasionally deviate from them, much to the benefit of several Baton Rouge-area schools (and the dismay of his readers from Lake Charles High). Baton Rouge Istrouma, for example, won all LHSAA Class AAA titles between 1955 and 1959 except for 1958—but was then able to grab the top spot in Class AAA in the LPGS' 1958 final postseason ratings as well.

Morning Advocate (1959)
Though the Baton Rouge Morning Advocate was normally content to just let the LHSAA teams determine the championships among themselves within the framework of the playoffs, shortly after the 1959 season they did issue a one-time postseason ranking of the top ten Class AAA teams to compare with the results of the Louisiana Prep Grid Standard mathematical system. The two rankings ended up "almost identical."

Louisiana Independent School Association (1970–1991)
In 1970 twenty private schools, many of which could probably be classified as segregation academies, formed the "Louisiana Independent School Association" (LISA). By 1971 the LISA had increased its membership to 54 schools. It also included at least one Arkansas school during its existence. When the LISA disbanded many of its member schools joined the Midsouth Association of Independent Schools.

Below is a listing of all LISA football champions.

Midsouth Association of Independent Schools (1988–Present)
The Mississippi Private School Association was formed in 1968, and individual Louisiana schools have been participating in it since at least 1988. When the LISA disbanded after the 1991–92 school year, a number of former LISA schools joined it. The association changed its name to the "Mississippi Association of Independent Schools" (MAIS) in 2009, and then to the "Midsouth Association of Independent Schools" in 2019 to more fully reflect its member institutions from Alabama, Arkansas, Louisiana, Mississippi, and Tennessee. As of 2020 there are thirteen MAIS schools located in Louisiana. Due to restrictions issued by the state government, Louisiana's MAIS schools were initially the only Louisiana high schools that could play football during the COVID-19 pandemic, provided that they not play their games within the borders of Louisiana.

Below is a listing of all Louisiana-based MAIS football champions (beginning with the 2019 season, classes A and AA were reorganized to reflect the winners of MAIS' eight-man football championships and, as such, is not included with this listing).

Louisiana Christian School Athletic Association (2006–2011)
The Louisiana Christian School Athletic Association (LCSAA) began competition during the 1981–82 school year, with formal championship competition between its 24 member schools coming during the 1984–85 term. Although very similar in nature to the make-up of the LISA, it differed slightly in that LISA schools were not necessarily parochial schools while LCSAA schools always were. Regardless, LISA schools did have a tendency to be Protestant-based academies, concentrated within Protestant-majority North Louisiana; LCSAA schools—also largely Protestant academies—were more often clustered in Louisiana's predominantly Catholic Acadiana region, giving its schools much fewer potential students to draw from. With smaller schools than the LISA, it initially could not sustain eleven-man football programs (although it did manage to foster six-man and eight-man football competition). It did eventually attempt to add eleven-man football as a league sport for the 2006 season, starting with four teams.

Association of Christian Educators of Louisiana (2012–2014)
In 2012 the LCSAA was "reformed" as the "Association of Christian Educators of Louisiana" (ACEL). Although it had more than 30 member schools in 2013, most did not field football teams. It actually featured two "divisions" for football, however, including one for eight-man football that contained 7 schools. However, after three seasons it no longer had enough schools sustaining eleven-man football teams to warrant sanctioning further championship competition and, as of the 2020 season, has not resumed sponsoring the sport. However, with five schools still fielding eight-man teams, the ACEL has been able to continue fostering competition for that particular form of the sport.

Louisiana Independent Football Tournament (2015–Present)
With the ACEL membership no longer fielding enough eleven-man football teams to merit additional formal championships, some remaining teams (primarily those with homeschooling backgrounds, which are able to rely on a growing number of students) went outside the association to continue participating in championship competition. They formed the "Louisiana Independent Football Tournament" (LIFT) to compete in.

State championships by school*

Notes: *—although MAIS championships are not, strictly speaking, "state" championships per se, those titles are included with these totals for comparative purposes; **—most recent school name is used, when available

National championships by school
Several Louisiana high schools have also won national championships.

The state of Louisiana itself actually had a direct impact on several early high school national crowns as the Louisiana Sports Association hosted a series of games at Tiger Stadium in Baton Rouge called the "National High School Championship" in 1938 and 1939, the latter of which included an appearance by Louisiana's own Baton Rouge High. McKinley had the chance to host a similar national championship game for black schools but, after deciding against participating in the postseason, went to watch the Baton Rouge High game instead.

Team and coaching superlatives
Nineteen different schools in the parish of East Baton Rouge have won 72 total titles, including 14 different schools within the city limits of Baton Rouge that have won 63 total titles (this city total does not include, however, 4 championships forfeited by Catholic High and Southern Lab—or any won by Central High or Dunham, which used Baton Rouge postal ZIP Codes at the time but are now considered part of the newly-incorporated cities of Central and St. George respectively).

Curtis is the school with the most championships (27), and Lafayette Acadiana Christian Athletics is the school with the most consecutive championships (6). Haynesville is the public school with the most championships (17)—and most consecutive LHSAA championships (4), tied with Ferriday and Edna Karr of New Orleans (although Istrouma as a public school actually won 5 consecutive crowns when counting its 1955, 1956, 1957, and 1959 LHSAA titles along with its top-place finish in the 1958 Louisiana Prep Grid Standard final postseason rankings). Istrouma is the school with the most championships within the LHSAA's highest classification (9). Curtis is now a member of the New Orleans Catholic League, a district within the LHSAA that is well-represented on the listings above.

Long-term successful teams like Curtis, Haynesville, and Istrouma are known for having programs with extensive family ties. Curtis' head coach, John T. Curtis Jr.—the second-winningest head coach in high school football history—is the son of the school's founder and has had numerous family members serve as assistant coaches or players for the team. He has also won more state championships than any other coach in the country. Haynesville has had a very successful transition of its head coaching position from Alton "Red" Franklin to his son, David. Istrouma similarly had a very successful transition of its head coaching position from Ellis A. "Little Fuzzy" Brown to his twin brother, James E. "Big Fuzzy" Brown. In addition, Robert Andrew "Racer" Holstead, Sr., formerly the winningest high school football head coach in the state, coached Tallulah High to four LHSAA football championships, Tallulah Academy to three LISA championships and one MAIS championship—and even Plaquemine to one LHSAA basketball championship; recently his grandson, Chad Mahaffey, also coached University Lab to four state championships. Like Holstead, Baton Rouge Christian Home Educators Fellowship (LCSAA, ACEL, and LIFT), Easton (Times–Picayune, National Farm and Live Stock Show, and LHSAA), and Southern Lab (LIALA, LIALO, and LHSAA) have also won trophies from three different sources.

Records from schools and coaches with documented all-time won–loss standings, however, indicate that having programs among the winningest in the state does not necessarily always correlate with earning state championships.

Note: *—although school is known to have participated in football as a varsity-level sport prior to years listed, records for those seasons are not fully documented

See also
 List of Alabama High School Athletic Association championships
 List of Arkansas state high school football champions
 List of California state high school football champions
 List of Missouri state high school football champions
 List of PIAA football state champions
 West Virginia High School Football State Championships and playoff history
 High School Football National Championship

References

high school football champions